Al Rayyan Volleyball is a professional Volleyball team based in Al-Rayyan, Qatar. It competes in the Qatari Volleyball League. They participated in the 2012 edition of the FIVB Volleyball Men's Club World Championship held in Qatar after winning the Heir Apparent Cup. The club hired four top athletes to strengthen the team before the 2012 Club World Championships. These include Rodrigão from Brazil, the Bulgarian brothers Georgi and Valentin Bratoev, and the American David Lee, a Gold medalist in Beijing 2008. They did not advance past the group stage.
The best achievement for the Al Rayyan volleyball team was in 2014 when they came in the second place in the World Club championship. The squad included Michael Sánchez, Raphael Vieira de Oliveira, Matey Kaziyski and Robertlandy Simón as foreign players in the team.
Al Rayan won the GCC Champions Cup in 2011 and 2015 as well as the Arab championship and Asian cup.

Honors

Domestic
 Qatar Volleyball League
 Winners (10): 1993, 1995, 1998, 2001, 2007, 2013, 2014, 2015, 2018, 2022
 Emir Cup
 Winners (13): 1987, 1989, 1994, 1999, 2000, 2003, 2006, 2007, 2010, 2012, 2013, 2017, 2018
Crown Prince Cup
 Winners (9): 1993, 1995, 2002, 2003, 2007, 2010, 2011, 2013, 2016

International
 Asian Club Championship
 Runners-up: 2013, 2014
 Third place: 2019
 Fourth place: 2002

 World Club Championship
 Runners-up: 2014

 GCC Volleyball Club Championship
 Winners (3): 2011,2015,2016
 Runners-up: 2014

 Arab Volleyball Clubs Championship
 Winners (1): 2018

 Arab Volleyball Clubs Championship Cup Winners
 Winners (1): 2000

Squad
Squad for 2014 FIVB Volleyball Men's Club World Championship
Head coach:  Igor Arbutina

Technical staffAs of August 1st, 2017/Notable playersThis list of former players includes those who received international caps while playing for the team, made significant contributions to the team in terms of appearances or goals while playing for the team, or who made significant contributions to the sport either before they played for the team, or after they left. It is clearly not yet complete and all inclusive, and additions and refinements will continue to be made over time.''

Qatar
  Ali Eshagh Bairami
  Ali Hamid Yaghoub
  Abdulrashid Awel Abdulrahman

Brazil
  Ramon Moreno
  Alan Domingos
  Raphael Vieira de Oliveira (Loan)
  Rodrigo Santana (Loan)

Bulgaria
  Matey Kaziyski (Loan)
  Valentin Bratoev

Croatia
  Igor Omrčen
   Mario Močić

Cuba
  Yosleider Cala 
  Wilfredo León
  Leonel Marshall Jr.
  Alberto Daniel La Rosa Marquez
  Raidel Poey
  Javier González Panton
  Robertlandy Simón (Loan)

Venezuela
  Carlos Tejeda

France
  Philippe Barca-Cysique
  Loic De Kergret
  Antonin Rouzier (Loan)

Iran
  Farhad Ghaemi 

Italy
  Cristian Savani
  Wout Wijsmans
  Ángel Dennis
  Hristo Zlatanov
  Lorenzo Bernardi

Serbia
  Ivan Miljković (Loan)

Finland
  Mikko Oivanen (Loan)

United States
  David Cameron Lee (Loan)
  Brook Billings

Sweden
  Marcus Nilsson

Hungary
  Péter Veres

Saudi Arabia
  Ahmed Al Bakhet

Kenya
  Phillip Kipyego Maiyo

Russia
  Dmitriy Ilinykh

Managerial history
  Ashraf Mehdi
  Eid Mubarak
  Mohammed Faraj (1987–90)
  Dragan Mihailović (2009/10)
  Mohammed Al Bahri (2011/12 until February 2012)
  Dragan Popović (2012/2013) (Caretaker)
  Ljubomir Travica (2012/13 until March 2014)
  Daniele Bagnoli (2014/15 until November 2015)
  Igor Arbutina (2009/2010, 2010/2011, 2012, March 2014, 2015/2016)
  Carlos Eduardo Schwanke ( February /2017 - 2018)

References

External links
 Al Rayyan Official Website 

Qatari volleyball clubs
Al-Rayyan SC